Kobad Ghandy (born 1951) is an Indian communist activist and ideologue. He became involved in revolutionary politics whilst a student in England in the 1970s, and worked as an organizer for the civil rights movement in India. He was a founding member of the Committee for the Protection of Democratic Rights. He was arrested on the accusation of being a politburo member of the underground Communist Party of India (Maoist) in 2009. He was acquitted and released after almost a decade in jail in 2019.

Early life
Kobad Ghandy was born to Nergis and Adi. Adi was a senior finance executive in Glaxo. He hails from a wealthy Parsi family in Mumbai. Ghandy attended The Doon School and later St. Xavier's College, Mumbai. He went to Cambridge University, England to pursue a course in chartered accountancy but got initiated in radical politics, was deeply influenced by the revolutionary ideology and returned to India with his course unfinished.

Return to India
Upon his return to India, he became active in revolutionary politics in Maharashtra. He was the founding member of Committee for the Protection of Democratic Rights. He spent the late 1970s and early 1980s in Nagpur, working as a CPDR organizer.

Party leader
Ghandy became a member of the Central Committee of the Communist Party of India (Marxist-Leninist) People's War in 1981. When the CPI(Maoist) was formed in 2004, he remained a Central Committee member of the new merged party.  Ghandy reportedly participated in a 2005 meeting with the Nepalese Maoist leadership in Delhi, along with Kishenji, Prachanda and Baburam Bhattarai.

Ghandy was elevated to the Politburo of the CPI(Maoist) at the 2007 Unity Congress. He was placed in charge of the CPI(M) Central Committee sub-committee on mass organisations and was responsible for the production of English-language party materials. He was expelled from the party in December 2021 for his anti-party statement in his book Fractured Freedom: A Prison Memoir, over charges of straying from the party line of dialectical materialism, embracing spiritualism and bourgeois idealism.

Arrest
He was arrested in South Delhi by the  om 17 September 2009 while undergoing treatment for cancer. His arrest was made public on September 21, 2009. Per a statement by CPI(Maoist) the arrest had occurred after Ghandy had been betrayed by a party courier. Ghandy had made a visit to the guerrilla zone prior to his arrest. He was released from prison on bail in 2019, after serving a majority of his jail term in Vishakapatnam Central Jail.

Personal life
Kobad Ghandy married Anuradha Shanbag in 1977 She was also a Central Committee member of CPI(Maoist). She died of cerebral malaria in April 2008 in the jungles of Dandakaranya in Central India.

Popular culture
The character 'Govind Suryavanshi' in the 2012 Bollywood film Chakravyuh, portrayed by Om Puri, is said to be based upon Kobad Ghandy.

See also
Chhatradhar Mahato
Jagdish Mahto

References

External links
 From jail, Kobad Ghandy submits paper on inclusive growth to New Delhi seminar | ICAWPI - International Campaign Against War on the People in India, 20 October 2010
 Letter to the Editor - Kobad Ghandy, one of the senior-most leaders of the CPI (Maoist), remembers his wife and comrade Anuradha Ghandy, the only woman in the Central Committee of the CPI (Maoists), who died in April 2008 of cerebral malaria. | OPEN Magazine, 8 May 2010

Communist Party of India (Maoist) politicians
1951 births
The Doon School alumni
Living people
Parsi people from Mumbai
Politicians from Mumbai
20th-century Indian politicians
Inmates of Tihar Jail
St. Xavier's College, Mumbai alumni
Alumni of the University of Cambridge